Naqiabad (also Romanized as Naqīābād) is a village in Fenderesk-e Jonubi Rural District, Fenderesk District, Ramian County, Golestan Province, Iran. At the 2006 census, its population was 626, in 156 families.

References 

Populated places in Ramian County